Maria Scutti (August 1928 - 2005) was an Italian paralympic athlete who won 15 medals, ten of which were gold, at the 1960 Summer Paralympics in Rome.

Nicknamed the "golden woman" (donna d'oro) thanks to these successes, Maria Scutti is the athlete who got the highest number of medals in a single edition of the Paralympic Games (in four different sports), and the second Italian athlete for total number of medals won, behind Roberto Marson (26 medals in 4 editions).

Biography

Maria Scutti was born in August 1928 in Altino, in the province of Chieti, Abruzzo, Italy. Married and mother of two children, in 1957, at the age of 29, she lost the use of her legs following a road accident while driving a motorcycle-van. During her rehabilitation after hospitalization at the center for paraplegics in Ostia, she discovered a passion for sports and in 1958 began to compete in many disciplines.

Scutti competed in the 1960 Summer Paralympics in her home country, Italy. She entered eleven throwing events in athletics, winning nine of them and coming third in the remaining two. She won a gold in swimming for the 50 m breaststroke as well as a silver in the 50 m backstroke. Scutti also won silver medals in both wheelchair fencing and table tennis. These accomplishments mean that Scutti is one of the most successful Paralympians at a single Games.

Ended the sporting career in 1962 with budget of 22 gold medals, 9 silver medals, and 2 bronze medals, Scutti died in 2005 at the age of 77 years old.

See also
Italy at the 1960 Summer Paralympics
List of multiple Paralympic gold medalists at a single Games
Italy at the Paralympics - Multiple medallists

References

External links
 

1928 births
2005 deaths
Athletes (track and field) at the 1960 Summer Paralympics
Paralympic athletes of Italy
Paralympic swimmers of Italy
Paralympic table tennis players of Italy
Paralympic wheelchair fencers of Italy
Paralympic gold medalists for Italy
Paralympic silver medalists for Italy
Paralympic bronze medalists for Italy
Medalists at the 1960 Summer Paralympics
Italian female fencers
Paralympic medalists in athletics (track and field)
Paralympic medalists in swimming
Paralympic medalists in table tennis
Paralympic medalists in wheelchair fencing
Italian female javelin throwers
Italian female shot putters
Italian female swimmers
Italian female table tennis players
Wheelchair javelin throwers
Wheelchair shot putters
Paralympic club throwers
Paralympic javelin throwers
Paralympic shot putters